Knej ( or ) is a small settlement west of Rašica in the Municipality of Velike Lašče in central Slovenia. The area is part of the traditional region of Lower Carniola and is now included in the Central Slovenia Statistical Region.

Name
The settlement was first attested in 1389 as zu dem Kne (and as in der Kneya in 1463 and Kney in 1484). The name Knej is believed to be related to Russian kneja (кнея) 'woods in the middle of a field' and Polish knieja 'woods where it is forbidden to cut; hunting area', both derived from Slavic *kъnъ 'stump', thus referring to a local geographical feature.

References

External links

Knej on Geopedia

Populated places in the Municipality of Velike Lašče